Museo Paludi di Celano (Italian for Swamps of Celano Museum)  is an archaeology museum in Celano, Province of L'Aquila (Abruzzo).

History

Collection

Notes

External links

Celano
Museums in Abruzzo
Archaeological museums in Italy
National museums of Italy